Reutlingen railway station is a railway station in the Swiss canton of Zurich and city of Winterthur. It takes its name from that city's Reutlingen quarter, in which it is situated. The station is located on the Winterthur to Etzwilen line. It is an intermediate stop on Zurich S-Bahn service S11, which links Aarau and Seuzach, and S29, which links Winterthur and Stein am Rhein.

References 

Reutlingen
Reutlingen